Gatis Sprukts (born August 29, 1996) is a Latvian professional ice hockey forward currently playing for HK Olimp/Venta 2002 of the Latvian Hockey Higher League.

Sprukts played one game for Dinamo Riga during the 2015–16 KHL season. He later played in the Alps Hockey League for EC Kitzbühel and in the FFHG Division 1 for Albatros de Brest before joining HK Zemgale on July 31, 2019.

References

1996 births
Living people
Brest Albatros Hockey players
Dinamo Riga players
Latvian ice hockey forwards
Sportspeople from Jelgava
HK Riga players
HK Zemgale players